H. K. Kumaraswamy (born ), is an Indian Politician, and a six-time member of the Karnataka Legislative Assembly. As of 2018, he is the MLA of Sakaleshpur constituency (for the 3rd consecutive term), and a JD(S) parlimentary board chairman.

He has served as JD(S) state president, and Cabinet Minister of Women & Child Welfare in the government of Karnataka.

Personal Life 
Kumaraswamy is married to C.T. Chanchala Kumari. He has a son and two daughters.

References

1955 births
Living people
Janata Dal (Secular) politicians
Karnataka MLAs 2008–2013
Karnataka MLAs 2013–2018
Karnataka MLAs 2018–2023